Clarence Bloomfield Moore (January 14, 1852 – March 24, 1936), more commonly known as C.B. Moore, was an American archaeologist and writer. He studied and excavated Native American sites in the Southeastern United States.

Early life
The son of writer Clara Jessup Moore, and businessman Bloomfield Haines Moore (1819–1878), he earned a Bachelor of Arts degree at Harvard University in 1873.  He traveled in nearly every part of Europe, Asia Minor, and Egypt; he crossed the Andes and went down the Amazon River in 1876, and made a trip around the world in 1878–79, before returning home when his father died in 1878.

Career
After his father's death, Moore became the president of the family company, Jessup & Moore Paper Company, retained that role for the majority of the 1880s, and earned millions during his tenure.  By the late 1880s, he was eager to pursue his lifelong interest in archaeology and turned over company management to others.

From 1892 to 1894, Moore performed excavations at St. Johns Shell Middens in Florida.  Between 1897 and 1898, he also dug at the Irene Mound (outside Savannah, Georgia) and exhumed seven human skeletons.  He accessed many of these sites by water, in his steamboat named the Gopher.  Over a period of 20 years, he explored Indian mounds in nearly all the Southern states.  His writings, for the most part published by the Academy of Natural Sciences in Philadelphia, include "Some Aboriginal Sites in Louisiana and in Arkansas" (1913).

Moore was elected a member of the American Antiquarian Society in 1895.

Legacy
In 1990, the Lower Mississippi Valley Survey of Harvard University, in conjunction with the Southeastern Archaeological Conference, created the C.B. Moore Award for Excellence in Southeastern Archaeology by a Young Scholar. This award was renamed in October of 2021 to the "SEAC Rising Scholar Award" as a recognition the problematic nature of Moore's work on burial mounds and his treatment of American Indian ancestor's remains.

The Clarence B. Moore House was listed on the National Register of Historic Places in 1973.

Works
 The East Florida Expeditions of Clarence Bloomfield Moore. Jeffrey Mitchem, ed. University of Alabama Press, 1999.
 The Georgia and South Carolina Coastal Expeditions of Clarence Bloomfield Moore. Lewis Larson, ed. University of Alabama Press, 1998.
 The Louisiana and Arkansas Expeditions of Clarence Bloomfield Moore.  Richard Weinstein, David H. Kelley, and Joe W Saunders, ed.  University of Alabama Press, 2004.
 The Lower Mississippi Valley Expeditions of Clarence Bloomfield Moore.  Dan Morse and Phyllis Morse, ed. University of Alabama Press, 1998.
 The Moundville Expeditions of Clarence Bloomfield Moore. Vernon Knight, ed.  University of Alabama Press, 1996.
 The Northwest Florida Expeditions of Clarence Bloomfield Moore.  David S. Brose and Nancy Marie White, ed. University of Alabama Press, 1999
 The Southern and Central Alabama Expeditions of Clarence Bloomfield Moore.  Craig Sheldon, Jr, ed.  University of Alabama Press, 2001.
 The Tennessee, Green, and Lower Ohio River Expeditions of Clarence Bloomfield Moore.  Richard Polhemus, ed.  University of Alabama Press, 2002.
 West and Central Florida Expeditions of Clarence Bloomfield Moore. Jeffrey Mitchem, ed.  University of Alabama Press, 1999.

References

Further reading
Clarence Bloomfield Moore (1852–1936) - Encyclopedia of Arkansas at www.encyclopediaofarkansas.net
 

American science writers
American archaeologists
Harvard University alumni
1852 births
1936 deaths
Writers from Philadelphia
Members of the American Antiquarian Society